Rodney Scott (born 1971) is an American chef and whole-hog barbecue pitmaster from Hemingway, South Carolina. In 2018 Scott was named Best Chef: Southeast by the James Beard Foundation, only the second pitmaster to win a James Beard chef award.

Early life 
Scott was born in 1971 in Philadelphia to Roosevelt and Ella Scott. He was an only child. In 1972 the family relocated to the Pee Dee area of South Carolina, where the family ran several businesses including a gas station, a variety store, a farm, and a barbecue restaurant. At around eleven, Scott first started barbecuing at his parents' business, Scott's Variety Store + Bar-B-Q in Hemingway, South Carolina, where at first the family would smoke a whole hog each week, expanding as demand increased until they were smoking seven or eight hogs a day. At 17 he was working for the family business full time.

Career 
In 2009 the family business was profiled by Southern food historian John T. Edge. In 2011, Scott took over the family barbecuing business. A sometime customer, Nick Pihakis, told him he was undercharging for his food. In 2016 he and his father quarreled and he left the family business to partner with Pihakis.

Scott opened Rodney Scott's BBQ in Charleston in 2017 and in Birmingham in 2019. As of March, 2021, a third location was set to open in Atlanta. A fourth location opened in December 2021 in Alabama.

Recognition 
In 2018 Scott was named Best Chef:Southeast by the James Beard Foundation, only the second pitmaster to win a James Beard chef award. He was featured on Chef's Table in 2020. The Washington Post called him a barbecue celebrity. In 2020 he was nominated to the Barbecue Hall of Fame. Texas Monthly called him "a whole hog legend". Daniel Vaughn of Texas Monthly wrote that Scott was "an undeniable master of the pit".

Books 

 Rodney Scott’s World of BBQ: Recipes and Perspectives from the Legendary Pitmaster

References 

American chefs
James Beard Foundation Award winners
People from Philadelphia
People from Hemingway, South Carolina
1971 births
Living people